State of health (SoH) is a figure of merit of the condition of a battery (or a cell, or a battery pack), compared to its ideal conditions. The units of SoH are percent points (100% = the battery's conditions match the battery's specifications).

Typically, a battery's SoH will be 100% at the time of manufacture and will decrease over time and use. However, a battery's performance at the time of manufacture may not meet its specifications, in which case its initial SoH will be less than 100%.  The biggest factors that contribute to battery degradation are driver patterns, driver aggression, climate, cabin thermal dynamics, and infrastructure, with driver patterns and climate being the biggest.

SoH evaluation
 First, a battery management system evaluates the SoH of the battery under its management and reports it.
 Then, the SoH is compared to a threshold (typically done by the application in which the battery is used), to determine the suitability of the battery to a given application.

Knowing the SoH of a given battery and the SoH threshold of a given application:
 a determination can be made whether the present battery conditions make it suitable for that application
 an estimate can be made of the battery's useful lifetime in that application

Parameters
As SoH does not correspond to a particular physical quality, there is no consensus in the industry on how SoH should be determined.
The designer of a battery management system may use any of the following parameters (singly or in combination) to derive an arbitrary value for the SoH.
 Internal resistance / impedance / conductance
 Capacity
 Voltage
 Self-discharge
 Ability to accept a charge
 Number of charge–discharge cycles
 Age of the battery
 Temperature of battery during its previous uses
 Total energy charged and discharged
In addition, the designer of the battery management system defines an arbitrary weight for each of the parameter's contribution to the SoH value. The definition of how SoH is evaluated can be a trade secret.

SOH threshold
As stated before, the method by which the battery management system evaluates the SoH of a battery is arbitrary.
Similarly, the SoH threshold below which an application deems a particular battery unsuitable is also arbitrary; a given application may accept a battery with a SoH of 50% and above, while a more critical application may only accept batteries with a SoH of 90% and above. Typically this relates to instantaneous drops in the supplied voltage, and subsequent inability for the connected power electronics to operate normally.

See also
 Battery balancer
 Battery charger
 Battery fade
 Battery monitoring
 Depth of discharge
 Recovery effect
 State of charge

References

External links
 State of Health (SOH) Determination
 Fuzzy logic estimation of SOH of 125Ah VRLA batteries
 Impedance Data and State of Health

Battery charging
Rechargeable batteries
Automotive technologies
Electric vehicle technologies